The Juno Award for "Songwriter of the Year" has been awarded since 1971, as recognition each year for the best songwriter in Canada.  It was also known as the Juno Award for "Composer of the Year" from 1975 to 1990.

Formerly presented for a single song, in its contemporary form the award is presented for two or three songs by the same songwriter; as long as the songwriter is Canadian, they may be nominated for songs that were recorded or performed by non-Canadian artists. Songwriting collaborators share in the nomination if they are both Canadian and common to all of the nominated songs; collaborators will be acknowledged, but not formally included in the nomination, if they did not share credit on all of the nominated songs or if they are not Canadians.

Winners

Best Songwriter (1971 - 1974)
1971 - Gene MacLellan (Special Award Canadian Composer)
1972 - Rich Dodson
1973 - Gordon Lightfoot
1974 - Murray McLauchlan

Composer of the Year (1975 - 1990)
1975 - Paul Anka
1976 - Hagood Hardy, "The Homecoming"
1977 - Gordon Lightfoot, "The Wreck of the Edmund Fitzgerald"
1978 - Dan Hill (Co-composer), "Sometimes When We Touch"
1979 - Dan Hill (Co-composer), "Sometimes When We Touch"
1980 - Frank Mills, "Peter Piper"
1981 - Eddie Schwartz, "Hit Me with Your Best Shot"
1982 - Mike Reno / Paul Dean, "Turn Me Loose"
1983 - Bob Rock / Paul Hyde, "Eyes of a Stranger"
1984 - Bryan Adams / Jim Vallance, "Cuts Like a Knife"
1985 - Bryan Adams / Jim Vallance
1986 - Jim Vallance
1987 - Jim Vallance
1989 - Tom Cochrane
1990 - David Tyson / Christopher Ward

Songwriter of the Year (1991 - 1998)
1991 - David Tyson
1992 - Tom Cochrane
1993 - k.d. lang / Ben Mink
1994 - Leonard Cohen
1995 - Jann Arden
1996 - Alanis Morissette
1997 - Alanis Morissette (Glen Ballard, co-songwriter)
1998 - Sarah McLachlan with Pierre Marchand, "Building a Mystery" by Sarah McLachlan

Best Songwriter (1999 - 2002)

Songwriter of the Year (2003 - Present)

References

Songwriter